Magician Mickey is a 1937 Walt Disney Mickey Mouse cartoon, originally released to theaters on February 6, 1937. This was the 92nd Mickey Mouse short to be released, and the third for that year.

Mickey puts on a magic show, but is interrupted by Donald Duck. Mickey gets his revenge on Donald through his tricks.

Plot
When a jealous Donald Duck tries to sabotage Mickey's magic act, he ends up becoming the victim of many of his magic tricks. In the end, Donald shoots the fireworks from Mickey's flare gun but accidentally causes the entire stage collapse on top of them. Mickey and Goofy pop up, unharmed, but Donald is burned from the fire and angrily rambles famously.

Voice cast
 Mickey Mouse: Walt Disney
 Donald Duck: Clarence Nash
 Goofy: Pinto Colvig

Releases
 1937 – theatrical release
 1957 – Disneyland, episode #3.15: "All About Magic" (TV)
 c. 1983 – Good Morning, Mickey!, episode #38 (TV)
 c. 1992 – Mickey's Mouse Tracks, episode #18 (TV)
 c. 1992 – Donald's Quack Attack, episode #28 (TV)
 2011 – Have a Laugh!, episode #24 (TV)

Home media
The short was released on December 4, 2001, on Walt Disney Treasures: Mickey Mouse in Living Color.

Additional releases include:
 1984 – "Cartoon Classics: Mickey's Crazy Careers" (VHS)
 2006 – "Funny Factory with Mickey" (DVD)

See also
Mickey Mouse (film series)

References

External links
 

1937 films
1930s color films
1937 animated films
Mickey Mouse short films
Donald Duck short films
Films about magic and magicians
Films directed by David Hand
Films produced by Walt Disney
1930s Disney animated short films
1930s American films